Brithura is a genus of true crane fly.

Distribution
India, Taiwan and China.

Species
B. argyrospila (Alexander, 1935)
B. brulleana (Alexander, 1971)
B. crassa Edwards, 1916
B. fracticosta (Alexander, 1935)
B. fractistigma Alexander, 1925
B. guangxiensis Liu and Yang, 2009
B. imperfecta (Brunetti, 1913)
B. jinpingensis Liu and Yang, 2009
B. keiliniana (Alexander, 1971)
B. nielseniana (Alexander, 1964)
B. nymphica Alexander, 1927
B. sancta Alexander, 1929

References

Tipulidae
Tipuloidea genera
Diptera of Asia